The MacKenzies of Paradise Cove (also known as Wonderland Cove) is an American six-episode drama miniseries which aired on ABC during the 1978–79 season from March 27 to May 18, 1979, following a television film pilot titled Stickin' Together that aired earlier in 1978.

Plot 
The series, set in Honolulu, follows the adventures of Bridget, Kevin, Celia, Michael and Timothy MacKenzie, five orphaned children ranging in age from 7 to 17 who, in an attempt to remain a family after their parents' death in a sailing accident, adopt Cuda Weber – a reluctant seagoing fisherman – as their unofficial guardian so that authorities will not split them up.

Cast 
Clu Gulager as Cuda Weber, a free-spirited fisherman who becomes a guardian to the MacKenzie kids
Lory Walsh as Bridget MacKenzie, the eldest daughter (17) and Kevin's twin sister
Shawn Stevens as Kevin MacKenzie, the eldest son (17) and Bridget's twin brother
Sean Marshall as Michael MacKenzie, the third oldest child (14)
Randi Kiger as Celia MacKenzie, the fourth child (12)
Keith Mitchell as Timothy MacKenzie, the youngest child at 7
Harry Chang as Barney, Cuda's friend
Moe Keale as "Big Ben" Kalikini, Cuda's friend
Sean Tyler Hall as “Little Ben Kalikini, the neighbor friend

Episodes

Home media release
In 1986, the series' 78-minute pilot film was released on videocassette under the title Wonderland Cove by Prism Entertainment.

References

External links 

1979 American television series debuts
1979 American television series endings
1970s American drama television series
American Broadcasting Company original programming
English-language television shows
Television series about families
Television shows set in Hawaii
Television shows filmed in Hawaii